Saqqez, also known as Saghez, Saqez, Saqqiz, Saqiz, and Sakīz, is the capital city of Saqqez County in Kurdistan Province, in northwestern Iran. According to the 2016 census, its population was 165,258.
In the middle of Zagros Mountains, the north-most part of mountainous Kurdistan within Iran's borders, an old city has been located between high tops of the region's mountains, called Saqqez. This city was someday the capital of Sakas sovereignty, the Middle-easteren immigrating people since 2000 years BC. People there speak kurdish but know persian as well.

Etymology 

The name Saqqez derives from the Scythian word "Eskit" and then "Sakez". Before that it was Izirtu, the capital of Mannaeans. In some historical sources it has been mentioned that the name of the city is derived from the name of powerful Median ruler Cyaxares (reigned 625 – 585 BC), who turned the empire into a regional power, but other historians believe that the name of the city is derived from Sakez and is attributed to the Scythians who settled in the city during the reign of Cyaxares.

Demographics 
The city is populated by Kurds who speak the Sorani dialect. David D'Beth Hillel (d. 1846) stated that the city was home to a small Jewish community with one synagogue dating from around 1827.

History 

Saqqez's history goes back to the seventh millennium BC. Based on historical ruins and Antiques which have been found in Saqqez,  like the historical treasures of Ziwiye hoard in the Ziwiyeh Castle, experts like Roman Ghirshman believe that the modern city of Saqqez is built on the site of the ancient capital of the Median empire. when Sargon II (reigned 722 – 705 BC) attacked the Median Empire and forced them to flee to Ecbatana (modern day Hamadan) and made this city his capital. On the attack of Sargon II, the ruler of  Assyria, the Medes were defended and their fortifications were destroyed. Thereafter, the Scythians tried to rebuild this city and they chose Saqqez, then named Eskit as their capital. This city was repeatedly attacked by Assyrians and Romans.

According to Vladimir Minorsky, Saqqez is the site of the earlier medieval city of Barza. According to Theophanes the Confessor, who calls the city "Barzan", the Byzantine emperor Heraclius stayed at Barza for seven days in March 628 while on his way to Ganzak. Barza was an important crossroads in the medieval period, where there was a fork in the road from Dinavar to Maragheh with one branch splitting off towards Urmia. In the early 9th century, Barza was the capital of a separate principality.

The city was the hometown of Mahsa Amini, who in 2022 died in the custody of Iran's morality police at the age of 22 after being arrested for violating Iran's hijab rules. Her death sparked the Mahsa Amini protests, a nationwide movement protesting the Islamic republic and its treatment of women.

Culture and art 
The city of Saqqez has been a place of culture and art since ancient times. In this city, performing arts and culture has a special place, and artists have created valuable works in various fields of art such as theater, painting, sculpture, music, literature, poetry, and cinema. In this city, every year at the end of the autumn season, a theater festival called The Kurdish Theater Festival is held, in which theater groups from all over Kurdistan perform their works. Also, in Saqqez, famous musicians and singers, such as Rashid Fayznejad perform their music and songs in the Kurdish language. Also there are well-known poets in this city, such as Abdul Karim Sahib, Mullah Ghafoor Dabbaghi, Jila Hosseini, Rahim Loghmani, Malekoalkalam majdi and Sheikh Hassan Molanabad.

Geography

Geology 
The city of Saqqez is built on long plains and hills, which are crossed by the main tributaries of rivers such as Zarrineh River and Simineh River. The lowlands and heights inside the city and the view of Saqqez River that passes through the center of this city are its special features. Saqqez is located in mountainous and highlands between the irregular heights of Zagros Mountains, and this special geomorphological feature has led to relatively cold climates and long winters and sometimes frost.

Climate 
At an altitude of 1,476 metres (4,842 feet), Saqqez has a Mediterranean continental climate (Köppen climate classification Dsa) with hot, very dry summers and cold, snowy winters. Summers feature large diurnal temperature variation due to decreased air density at high altitude and low humidity. Saqqez again reached −36 °C during the February 3–9 1972 Iran blizzard.

Rainfall is mild throughout the year, with late winter and early spring having the most precipitation, and the summers being practically rainless. Due to the foehn effect, the rainfall is not as heavy as it is in the exposed sites of the Zagros to the west, such as in Sardasht, which lies on the same altitude but is more exposed to the westerly cold front systems.

Transportation
The city will be served in the future by Saqqez Airport

See also 

 Bazaar of Saqqez
 Domenareh Mosque
 Karaftu Cave
 Haj Saleh Hammam
 Mount Chlchama

References

Sources
 
 

Towns and villages in Saqqez County
Cities in Kurdistan Province
Iranian Kurdistan
Kurdish settlements in Kurdistan Province
Historic Jewish communities in Asia